Silameghavanna was King of Anuradhapura in the 7th century, whose reign lasted from 614 to 623. He succeeded Moggallana III as King of Anuradhapura and was succeeded by his son Aggabodhi III.

See also
 List of Sri Lankan monarchs
 History of Sri Lanka

References

External links
 Kings & Rulers of Sri Lanka
 Codrington's Short History of Ceylon

Monarchs of Anuradhapura
S
S
S